Fragilariopsis cylindrus is a pennate sea-ice diatom that is found native in the Argentine Sea and Antarctic waters, with a pH of 8.1-8.4. It is regarded as an indicator species for polar water.

Description 
Fragilariopsis cylindrus is a unicellular, eukaryotic, microalgae that is important due to its ecological roles. This is because it is major contributor to climate change processes, responsible for 20% global carbon fixation, and forms a substantial basis of the marine food web, making up 40% of marine primary productivity.  F. cylindrus is found native to the Southern Ocean,  with their proximal side valve mantle being 1.6 μm, their girdle 0.75μm, apical axis ranging between 15.5μm to 55.0μm, transapical axis ranging from 2.4μm to 4.0μm, and their transapcial axis ranging from 2.4μm to 4.μm. Their transapical striae count is 10-16, with a mean of 10μm, while their row of poroids range from 50 to 56, in 10μm. F. cylindrus typically forms large populations in the bottom layer of sea ice, as well as in the wider sea-ice zone, which includes open waters. It is known for its ability to survive temperatures below 0°C, high salinity, the semi-enclosed pore systems within the ice, as well as low diffusion rates of dissolved gases and exchange of inorganic nutrients that occur within their environment. F. cylindrus is a phototropic organism, but is able to sustain essential metabolic processes in the dark, ensuring rapid recovery upon re-illumination, and allowing them to survive long-term darkness. Gram stain, cellulose activity, growth rate, motility and the microbe's ability to resist/produce antibiotics have are unknown at this moment.

References 

Bacillariales